The 2022–23 Tennessee State Tigers basketball team represented Tennessee State University in the 2022–23 NCAA Division I men's basketball season. The Tigers, led by fifth-year head coach Brian Collins, played their home games at the Gentry Complex in Nashville, Tennessee as members of the Ohio Valley Conference.

Previous season
The Tigers finished the 2021–22 season 14–18, 8–10 in OVC play to finish in a tie for fifth place. They defeated SIU Edwardsville in the first round of the OVC tournament, before falling to Southeast Missouri State in the quarterfinals.

Roster

Schedule and results

|-
!colspan=12 style=""| Non-conference regular season

|-
!colspan=12 style=""| OVC regular season

|-
!colspan=9 style=| Ohio Valley tournament

|-

Sources

References

Tennessee State Tigers basketball seasons
Tennessee State Tigers
Tennessee State Tigers basketball
Tennessee State Tigers basketball